Eat Pussy may refer to:

 Cunnilingus, an oral sex act
 "Eat Pussy", a song by Akinyele from Anakonda, 2001
 "Eat Pussy", a song by N.O.R.E. from Noreality, 2007
 “Smoke Weed Eat Pussy”, a Song by Ängie from 2016

See also
Cat meat